Harrisonia perforata is a species of liana in the family Rutaceae. Its recorded distribution includes: Andaman Islands, Nicobar Islands, Bangladesh, Myanmar, Indo-China, Java and Lesser Sunda Islands, but no subspecies are listed in the Catalogue of Life.

References

External links 
 Images at iNaturalist
 

Cneoroideae
Flora of Indo-China
Flora of Malesia
Taxa named by Francisco Manuel Blanco